Adan Amezcua may refer to:
Adán Amezcua (born 1974), Mexican professional baseball player
Adán Amezcua Contreras (born c. 1969), Mexican drug smuggler